Beurling is a surname. Notable people with the surname include:

 Arne Beurling (1905–1986), Swedish mathematician
 Elizabeth F. Beurling, fictional character in Japanese-origin anime/manga series Strike Witches
 George Beurling (1921–1948), Canadian fighter pilot

Toponyms
 Rivière Beurling (Beurling River) is a tributary of the Caniapiscau River (watershed of Ungava Bay), in the unorganized territory of Rivière-Koksoak, Quebec, Canada.